The Senior is an upcoming American sports drama film directed by Rod Lurie and starring Michael Chiklis as Mike Flynt. It is based on the true story of Flynt, who, at age 59, became a college football linebacker.

Cast
Michael Chiklis as Mike Flynt
Mary Stuart Masterson as Eileen
Rob Corddry as Sam Weston
Brandon Flynn as Micah
Corey Knight as Jeremy Cartwright
Terayle as Jamal Johnson

Production
The film was shot in Birdville Stadium in Halton, Texas.

In March 2022, it was announced that filming wrapped.

References

External links
 

Upcoming films
Films shot in Texas
Films directed by Rod Lurie